"Of Course He's Dead" is the series finale of the long-running sitcom Two and a Half Men, which ran for 12 seasons. The finale aired on CBS on February 19, 2015, an hour-long program constituting the series' 261st and 262nd half-hour episodes.
It had the show's largest audience since April 2013, with 13.52 million viewers. In the episode, Alan Harper discovers that his brother Charlie, presumed to have been killed in a train accident in the ninth season premier, has a fortune in unclaimed royalties. He eventually gathers enough evidence to confirm that Charlie is still alive and planning a grand act of revenge. Former cast members Angus T. Jones, April Bowlby and Jennifer Taylor make cameo appearances.

Plot
Alan Harper (Jon Cryer) receives a letter stating his presumed dead brother Charlie has $2.5 million in unclaimed royalties. He needs Charlie's death certificate to claim the money, but cannot find one and realizes his only proof is Rose's (Melanie Lynskey) word. Evidence that Charlie may be alive mounts after an unknown party claims the money, and Alan and his mother Evelyn (Holland Taylor) receive threatening messages. Meanwhile, Charlie's estranged daughter Jenny (Amber Tamblyn) receives a check for $100,000 along with an apology note, and a package addressed to Charlie arrives at the house. Several women from Charlie's past are shown receiving checks and personalized apology letters.

An unknown captive escapes Rose's basement, so Rose returns to the beach house to inform Alan and Walden Schmidt (Ashton Kutcher) that Charlie is alive. While in Paris, Rose caught Charlie in bed with a hooker, a mime and a goat. She tried to avenge his infidelity by pushing him into the path of an oncoming train, but the goat took the fall instead. Rose imprisoned Charlie in her dungeon until he escaped. Evelyn and Rose go into hiding, while Walden and Alan go to a police station and talk to Lieutenant Wagner (Arnold Schwarzenegger). Returning to the house, they find life-size cardboard cutouts of themselves wearing nooses with targets on the chests. Frightened, Alan calls his ex-wife Judith (Marin Hinkle) and several past girlfriends to tell them how much they each meant to him. Walden also calls two of his ex-girlfriends to apologize for how he behaved with each. All the women feign emotion while being generally dismissive.

Alan's son Jake (Angus T. Jones) shows up at the house, having left the Army and married a Japanese woman. He mentions having received a $250,000 check and a note reading, "I'm alive" before gambling with the money in Las Vegas, yielding $2.5 million in winnings. After Jake leaves, Wagner calls Alan and Walden to tell them he has captured Charlie, but the man is actually Christian Slater dressed in attire similar to Charlie's. Alan, Walden and Berta (Conchata Ferrell), believing Wagner, celebrate. A helicopter carrying a grand piano like Charlie's approaches the house, and the three ponder whether Wagner caught the right man, but quickly brush it off. Charlie, shown only from the back, walks up to the front door and rings the bell. Before anyone answers, he is killed when the helicopter drops the piano on him. The camera then pulls back to reveal the series' set and Chuck Lorre, sitting in the director's chair. He says "Winning!", breaking the fourth wall, just before a second grand piano falls on him.

Production
Prior to the finale, there was much speculation over whether former star Charlie Sheen would reprise his role as Charlie Harper. CBS had not announced who would guest star on the episode. At the Television Critics Association's winter press tour on January 15, 2015, Chuck Lorre spoke about the show and had nothing but praise for Sheen, saying, “It would be inappropriate to not acknowledge the extraordinary success we had with Charlie and how grateful I am, we all are, to his contributions. And there’s nothing but great feelings for the eight-and-a-half years we worked together. But how to wrap the show up, it's tricky. It's a tricky—it's a sticky wicket. Because, in a way, the show morphed into something else entirely for the last four years, and it's something we love, and we want to honor both. So, how to honor both has been the challenge of this finale. The other challenge is how to get people watching it without telling them what it is," he explained. He said he wanted the finale to honor both eras of the show, and that there were "no wounds,” following what happened with Sheen, saying "What happened, happened. And I’m grateful for the time we enjoyed working together and I’m very grateful Ashton came along and kept the lights on. What do I got to complain about? I’m so blessed.” When asked about the finale and the possibility of Sheen's return, creator Chuck Lorre responded "I think viewers will be very, very satisfied with the finale. That's all I'm going to say." Further teasing as to Sheen's return was given with the reveal of the episode's title, "Of Course He's Dead".

CBS President Nina Tassler said that Lorre had planned a "mystery sandwich" for the final episode. The episode was taped on February 6, 2015 and aired on February 19, 2015. It took two weeks to film. Lorre approached the finale with the intention of doing "everything we could to make a finale worth watching."

Jon Cryer revealed that while shooting for the finale, "there was a shoot day when they conspicuously called me and said, 'You're not in it.' I was like, What? What's happening that day?" Cast members were not even allowed to read the whole script and did not see the episode in its entirety until its airdate.
According to Cryer, filming for the episode was very emotional, and the finale is unlike any finale he's ever seen before. The animated flashback sequence that filled in the gaps between season 8 and season 9 was created by an outside company from Warner Bros.
Unusually for sitcoms shot in front of a live studio audience, the episode was shot out of sequence; it was just a couple of scenes, rather than the usual full episode, in order to shield surprises. Chuck Lorre told the audience members that, "You probably won't know what we're doing." Even Lorre got emotional when introducing the episode to the audience: "It's been an unbelievable experience. I'm getting a little … So, I'm going to stop." Each scene was clapped with the slate by former and current executive producers, including Lorre and Lee Aronsohn. Ashton Kutcher said that the episode felt more like an early episode of the show from its first two or three seasons, pointing to the involvement of Lorre and Aronsohn with Don Reo and Jim Patterson saying, "I felt their presence in the writing, there was a little different bite to it." More than 100 people who work on the show crowded onto its living room set for a group photo.

Lorre said that everybody "had a blast making it", and that the finale was "an attempt to acknowledge everything that we've been through and everything that people have come to expect from the show". He said that no expense was spared for the finale as they didn't need to worry about the budget as they were ending the show anyway and so producers just "went for it". In order to prevent plot details and secrets from being leaked, guest actors were only given the pages they were involved in and certain lines were redacted. Before 2011, the idea of how the show might end was envisioned as a teary sendoff of Jake to college.

The show was shot on Warner Brothers Stage 26, which was renamed "The Two and a Half Men Stage".

Lorre subsequently revealed in his vanity card that Sheen had been offered a cameo where he would walk up to the door of the beach house, give a rant about the dangers of drug use and his own invincibility, at which point his character would be killed by a falling piano. Sheen declined and the scene was filmed with a stand-in, shot from behind, and without dialogue. When discussing the infamous last scene, Lorre said that deciding to put himself in the final shot "felt like comedically the right thing to do. It's like 'Nobody gets out of here alive' may be the theme of this series. The proposition that anybody wins in something like this is ridiculous. That would have felt uncomfortable to me. So the second piano felt like the right thing to do".

Vanity card
Chuck Lorre's signature vanity card, shown at the end of the episode:

Reception

Ratings
"Of Course He's Dead" was a 60-minute episode that originally aired on February 19, 2015, on CBS. The finale was viewed by 13.52 million viewers and received a 3.2 rating/9% share among adults between the ages of 18 and 49. This means that it was seen by 3.2 percent of all 18- to 49-year-olds, and 9 percent of all 18- to 49-year-olds watching television at the time of the broadcast. This marked a significant increase, of over four million viewers, in the ratings from the previous episode, "Don't Give a Monkey a Gun". It also ranks as the highest rated episode of the season, as well as the highest-rated episode for the series since the tenth season entry "Bazinga! That's from a TV Show", which was viewed by 13.71 million viewers and received a 3.9/12% share. The episode ranked second in its timeslot, being beaten by the ABC drama series Scandal.

Critical reception
"Of Course He's Dead" received mixed reviews, with praise for the premise, cameo cast and meta-humor, but had criticism for the rushed season finale and anti-climax. Entertainment Weekly found it to be a good piece of television, "some of the unrelenting boldness inherent in the self-referential nature has to be applauded". They praised its unapologetic overtly self-referential meta approach: "Two and a Half Men never beat around the bush with its humor, with its awareness of what the audience thought of its actors. The finale celebrates that with being one of the most meta episodes of television ever devised; like it or not, Two and a Half Men won't apologize for ending that way". Overall they thought "'Of Course He's Dead' is certainly one of the most fascinating finales to air."

Max Nicholson of IGN gave it a 3.5 out of 10, saying: "I don't think I could come up with a worse ending than a faceless Charlie Harper walking up to the front doorstep of Alan's home, a grand piano falling on his head, and then a pull-out to Chuck Lorre sitting in his director's chair and turning around to say, 'Winning!' — and then a grand piano falling on his head...". They did however praise the clever meta-humor.

Time, on the other hand, gave a positive review of the finale, saying: "Its bawdy, sentimentality-free goodbye was a funny and deeply weird hour of score-settling, fourth-wall-breaking, hugs-and-tears-denying TV". Overall they felt "the show went out not with a 'Farewell, old friend' but with a 'See you in hell!'. Was it appropriate? Classy? I just know I laughed".

Corey Barker of TV.Com gave the episode a positive review. He thought "it was a legitimately funny episode of television that toyed with viewers' expectations all the way up until the last millisecond", as to whether or not Charlie Sheen would appear, which is what the episode was teasingly building up to. He argued that "it sure was fascinating. And for Two and a Half Men, that's a very fitting way to go out". He believed "Of Course He's Dead" to be more creative and clever than the show ever was: "For a sitcom that I never found to be creative or even clever, Two and a Half Men peppered its final hour with some really amusing — if obvious — moments". He also thought that the fact Sheen never showed up "made the finale's self-aware trolling even more successful."

HollywoodLife gave a positive review, saying they "were still laughing through the entire hour finale of the sitcom". They also enjoyed the self-referential jokes at the expense of the actors and show itself.

Daniel Fienberg of HitFix gave the episode a mixed review, saying: "The only people who lost were fans who watched an hour of the Two and a Half Men finale waiting for Charlie Sheen only to see a body double get flattened by a baby grand." However, he did "chuckle a couple times."

Variety gave a negative review of the episode, saying: "Diving into the business side of the show so relentlessly felt seriously misguided — and more than a little defensive", and that "while the sendoff addressed a certain kind of 'Winning', in the grand pantheon of series finales this wasn't even close to serving up a winner.

Zap2it.com felt that it was "a funny series finale", but was disappointed that Sheen didn't appear.

Michael Hewitt gave the episodes a positive review saying, "Now, that’s how you do a finale." He believed the show closed 'in style'.

Emily VanDerWerff of Vox gave a positive review: "You almost had to admire its sheer willingness to follow its vision off the cliff... it's an utterly bonkers episode of television". In the end she had much respect for the episode, saying: "I was never a huge fan of Two and a Half Men, but I am struck with a weird respect for this episode, which realized it was in a hole and just kept digging. Most American sitcoms end with big group hugs and couples reuniting. But the Two and a Half Men finale is an utterly whacked-out tribute to the series it caps. It gives absolutely no shits, and it's kind of glorious."

Charlie Sheen's reaction
Charlie Sheen, former star of Two and a Half Men, did not enjoy the episode and the closing vanity card, and launched another attack on Lorre, saying:

References

External links 
 

2015 American television episodes
American television series finales
Season 12
Metafictional television episodes